Wyatt Gibbs (5 May 1830 – 25 May 1891) was an English cricketer.  Gibbs was a left-handed batsman who bowled right-arm roundarm fast.  He was born at West Itchenor, Sussex.

Gibbs made his first-class debut for Sussex against Hampshire at Day's Antelope Ground, Southampton in 1864.  He made four further first-class appearances for Sussex, the last of which came against Kent in 1865.  In his five first-class matches, he scored 42 runs at an average of 10.50, with a high score of 18.  With the ball, he took 7 wickets at a bowling average of 25.71, with best figures of 3/49.

He died at Bagshot, Surrey on 25 May 1891.

References

External links
Wyatt Gibbs at ESPNcricinfo
Wyatt Gibbs at CricketArchive

1830 births
1891 deaths
People from West Itchenor
English cricketers
Sussex cricketers
People from Bagshot